"Pseudomonas blatchfordae" is a Gram-negative soil bacteria isolated from tomato pith necrosis and the common bean (Phaseolus vulgaris). It is not a validly recognized species. Based on 16S rRNA analysis, it falls within the P. fluorescens group.

References

Pseudomonadales
Bacteria described in 1980